William Bremner (1884 – 30 March 1961) was a Cape Colony cricketer. He played in one first-class match for Border in 1906/07.

See also
 List of Border representative cricketers

References

External links
 

1884 births
1961 deaths
Cricketers from Cape Colony
Border cricketers
People from Queenstown, South Africa